Miami Sunset Senior High School is a secondary school of the Miami-Dade County Public Schools system. The principal is John C. Lux.

It is located in the Kendale Lakes census-designated place in unincorporated Miami-Dade County.

Demographics

In the academic year 2019–2020 there were 1,415 students enrolled. Approximately 89% were ethnically Hispanic, 6% white, 4% black, and 1% of Asian/Pacific origin. Just over half the students (1239) were eligible for free lunch.

Athletics

State championships
Soccer
Men's: 1989 (4A), 2004 (6A), 2005 (6A)
Tennis
Men's: 2000 (4A), 2001 (4A), 2002 (4A), 2003 (4A)
Women's: 1996 (6A), 1997 (6A), 1998 (6A), 1999 (6A), 2000 (4A), 2001 (4A), 2002 (4A), 2003 (4A), 2004 (4A), 2005 (4A)(state record for most consecutive championships)
Volleyball
Women's: 1980 (4A), 1985 (4A), 1987 (4A), 1988 (4A), 1993 (5A), 1995 (6A)

Notable alumni
Maria T. Abreu, gastroenterologist
Raúl Ibañez, MLB player
Cristie Kerr, LPGA Tour professional
David Lehman, IT Director Norwegian Cruise Lines
Anita Marks, ESPN announcer and former football player
Torrance Marshall, former NFL player
Maud Newton, writer
Kimberly Peirce, film director
Luis Alberto Perea, former MLS player
Eddy Piñeiro, NFL football player
Ronni Reis (born 1966), tennis player
Fuad Reveiz, former NFL player
Sol Rodriguez, actress
 Frank Rubio, NASA astronaut
Tony Succar, musician
Eric Vasquez, former MLS player
Alan Veingrad (born 1963), NFL American football player

See also
 Miami-Dade County Public Schools
 Education in the United States

References

External links 
 Miami Sunset High School website
 Miami-Dade County public schools information
 GreatSchools Overview

Miami-Dade County Public Schools high schools
Educational institutions established in 1977
1977 establishments in Florida